The German-speaking Community (also known as East Belgium, is one of the three federal communities of Belgium, with an area of  in the Liège Province of Wallonia, including nine of the eleven municipalities of Eupen-Malmedy. Traditionally speakers of Low Dietsch, Ripuarian, and Moselle Franconian varieties, the population numbers 77,949about 7.0% of Liège Province and about 0.7% of the national total.

Bordering the Netherlands, Germany and Luxembourg, the area has its own parliament and government at Eupen. The German-speaking Community of Belgium was annexed in 1920 from Germany. There are also some other areas where German is spoken that belonged to Belgium before 1920, but are not part of the German-speaking Community: Bleiberg-Welkenraedt-Baelen in northeastern province of Liège and Arelerland (the city of Arlon and some of its nearby villages in southeastern province of Belgian Luxembourg), although German is declining in them due to the expansion of French.

History 
The area known today as the East Cantons consists of the German-speaking Community and the municipalities of Malmedy and Waimes, which belong to the French Community of Belgium. The East Cantons were part of the Rhine Province of Prussia in the German Empire until 1920 (as the counties of Eupen and Malmedy), but were annexed by Belgium following Germany's defeat in World War I and the subsequent Treaty of Versailles. The peace treaty of Versailles demanded the "questioning" of the local population. People who were unwilling to become Belgians and wanted the region to remain a part of Germany were required to register themselves along with their full name and address with the Belgian military administration, headed by Herman Baltia, and many feared reprisals or even expulsion for doing so.

In the mid-1920s, there were secret negotiations between Germany and the kingdom of Belgium that seemed to be inclined to sell the region back to Germany as a way to improve Belgium's finances. A price of 200 million gold marks has been mentioned. At this point, the French government, fearing for the stability of the broader postwar order, intervened with Brussels and the Belgian-German talks were called off.

The new cantons had been part of Belgium for just 20 years when, in 1940, they were retaken by Germany in World War II. The majority of people of the east cantons welcomed this as they considered themselves German. Following the defeat of Germany in 1945, the cantons were once again annexed by Belgium, and as a result of alleged collaboration with Nazi Germany an attempt was made to de-Germanize the local population by the Belgian and Walloon authorities.

In the early 1960s, Belgium was divided into four linguistic areas, the Dutch-speaking Flemish area, the French-speaking area, the bilingual capital of Brussels, and the German-speaking area of the east cantons. In 1973, three communities and three regions were established and granted internal autonomy. The legislative Parliament of the German-speaking Community, was set up. Today the German-speaking Community has a fair degree of autonomy, especially in language and cultural matters, but it still remains part of the region of predominantly French-speaking Wallonia. There has been much argument in the past few years that the German-speaking Community should also become its own region, which is an ongoing process with the permanent transfer with the previous accord of some competences concerning social policy, conservation of sites and monuments, environment protection policy, transport, the financing of municipalities, among other things from the Walloon Region. One of the proponents of full regional autonomy for the German-speaking Community is Karl-Heinz Lambertz, the minister-president from 1999 to 2014. Especially regional autonomy for spatial planning, city building and housing should be considered, according to the government of the German-speaking Community.

Geography

Location 
The territory of the German-speaking Community is bounded on the north by the Belgium-Germany-Netherlands border tripoint, on the east by Germany and on the south by Luxembourg, and on the west by the territory of the French-speaking Community of Belgium.

Within Belgium, the German-speaking Community exercises its political powers on the German-speaking territory, which comprises nine municipalities. Eupen is the seat of the government, the parliament and the administrative centre.

The municipalities of Malmedy and Weismes belong to the territorial community of the French Community of Belgium. The German minority has its own rights there. Occasionally, the nine German-speaking communities, together with the communities of Malmedy and Weismes, are historically called East Belgium or East Cantons because of their common political past, formerly also as Eupen-Malmedy-St. Vith.

In March 2017, the government of the German-speaking community decided to market the area in the future as East Belgium. Analogous to South Tyrol (officially: Autonomous Region of Bolzano – South Tyrol), the name of the German-speaking Community of Belgium will continue to be used on official documents, on the external presentation, on the Internet and on the official posters of the ministry, the government and the parliament.

Government 

The German-speaking Community has its own government, which is appointed for five years by its own parliament. The Government is headed by a Minister-President, who acts as the "prime minister" of the Community, and is assisted by the Ministry of the German-speaking Community. The 2014–2019 government is formed by four Ministers:
 Oliver Paasch (ProDG), Minister-President and Minister for Local Government
 Isabelle Weykmans (PFF), Minister for Culture, Media and Tourism
 Lydia Klinkenberg (ProDG), Minister for Education
 Antonios Antoniadis (SP), Vice-Minister-President and Minister of Health and Social Affairs, Regional Planning and Housing

Municipalities 

The German-speaking Community consists of nine municipalities, listed in the table below. Numbers on the map to the right correspond to the "Map #" column in the table below.

( = comparable to previous year).

The population figures are those on 1 January 2020 (compare to a total of 73,675 on 1 January 2007). The municipalities are grouped into two cantons, namely the Canton of Eupen in the north and the Canton of Sankt Vith in the south. The wider region is included in the Arrondissement of Verviers.

Demographics 

In 2007, 73,675 inhabitants (86.3 inhabitants / km2) lived in the area of the German-speaking community. However, the population density in the canton of Eupen (north) and the canton of St. Vith (south) is very different:

District of Eupen: 44 159 inhabitants – 196,4 inhabitants / km2.
District of St. Vith: 29 516 inhabitants – 46,9 inhabitants / km2
The North-South demographic gap is particularly evident when comparing the North and South of the community:

The most densely populated municipality is Kelmis (577.9 inhabitants / km2);
The least densely populated municipality is Büllingen (36.2 inhabitants / km2).
By comparison, the population density is 346,7 in Belgium, 204,0 in Wallonia and 452,4 in Flanders. Men represent 49.72% with a slightly lower proportion of the total population of the German-speaking community, women are in the majority with 50.28%.

As of 2020 over 21% of the community is foreign-born, with Germans representing the overwhelming majority of that group.

See also 

 Parliament of the German-speaking Community and Government of the German-speaking Community
 List of Ministers-President of the German-speaking Community
 German-speaking electoral college (European Parliament constituency)
 German-speaking Europe
 German diaspora
 Low Dietsch
 
 Lists of protected heritage sites in the German-speaking Community of Belgium
 Belgian annexation plans after the Second World War

References

External links 

 , the official site of the German-speaking Community in Belgium.
 Government website
 Parliament website
 
 Prospecting an In-Between, East Belgium 1920–2020

 
Communities of Belgium
Society of Belgium
Belgium
Ethnic groups in Belgium
Geography of Liège Province
Regions of Wallonia
Politics of Wallonia
Liège Province
Wallonia
German-speaking countries and territories
States and territories established in 1984